Uliano Courville (born 8 August 1978 in France) is a French retired footballer.

Career

Courville started his career with AS Monaco in the French Ligue 1, where he made 5 league appearances.

In 2001, Courville signed for English second division side Portsmouth, where he failed to make an appearance. After that, he joined French lower league club Mantois 78, where he was given a 6-month ban due to substance use.

References

External links
 

Living people
Association football midfielders
1978 births
French footballers
AS Monaco FC players
AC Ajaccio players
Rapid de Menton players
Doping cases in association football
French sportspeople in doping cases